Bečváry is a municipality and village in Kolín District in the Central Bohemian Region of the Czech Republic. It has about 1,000 inhabitants.

Administrative parts
Villages of Červený Hrádek, Hatě, Horní Jelčany and Poďousy are administrative parts of Bečváry. Hatě and Horní Jelčany form an exclave of the municipal territory.

Geography
It lies in the Upper Sázava Hills. The Bečvárka Stream flows through the municipality and feed Podbečvárský Pond.

History
The first written mention of Bečváry is from 1265.

Sights
The landmark of Bečváry is the late Baroque castle. Construction of the castle started in the mid-18th century, but the building remained unfinished until the rule of Ernst Gideon von Laudon, who had the castle rebuilt and expanded between 1766 and 1774. Nowadays, the castle is not accessible to the public and is being gradually reconstructed by a private owner.

References

External links

Villages in Kolín District